Mahavisaurus is an extinct genus of rhytidosteid temnospondyl from the early Triassic period (Induan stage) of Iraro, Madagascar. It is known from the holotype MNHN MAE 3037, a nearly complete skull, recovered from the Middle Sakamena Formation. This genus was named by J. P. Lehman in 1966, and the type species is Mahavisaurus dentatus.

See also
 
 Prehistoric amphibian
 List of prehistoric amphibians

References

Stereospondyls
Triassic temnospondyls of Africa
Fossil taxa described in 1966
Early Triassic amphibians of Africa